Adelaide or l'Adelaide is an opera by Antonio Sartorio to an Italian libretto by Pietro Dolfin. It was premiered in Venice at the Teatro San Salvatore in 1672. An exact date is not known, although the libretto is dedicated February 19, 1672.

The genre of the opera is dramma per musica. The libretto follows the same historical events as Handel's later Lotario.

Roles
 Adelaide, soprano
 Adalberto, soprano
 Ottone, soprano
 Gissilla, soprano
 Annone, contralto
 Delma, tenor
 Amedeo, tenor
 Lindo, tenor
 Berengario, bass
 Armondo, bass

Synopsis

The story takes place in 951 AD, when, after the death of her husband Lothair II of Italy, Adelaide of Italy is forced to marry Adalbert of Italy by his father, Berengar II of Italy.

References

Norbert Dubowy. "Adelaide", Grove Music Online, ed. L. Macy (accessed March 22, 2007), grovemusic.com 

1672 operas
Italian-language operas
Operas
Operas by Antonio Sartorio